St. Lawrence High School is a private Catholic primary and secondary school for boys, located in Kolkata, West Bengal, India. It is among the top 5 schools in Kolkata. The school was founded in 1810 and run by the Jesuits, initially in Baithakhana, Sealdah, as an elementary school which came to be known as St. John Chrysostom School. It was renamed in January 1937 by Fr. Lawrence Rodriques, S.J. as St. Lawrence High School. The school caters for approximately 3,000 students.

History 
St.Lawrence High School traces its roots to an elementary school at the Church of Our Lady of Dolours at Baithakkhana, Sealdah, in 1810. In 1855 it was known as St. John Chrysostom's School and prepared students for the Lower Primary Examination. In 1902 it became the site of St. Ann’s Orphanage and included Upper Primary School; teaching was in Bengali but instruction in English was included. In 1913 teaching turned to English and boys were prepared for the Junior Cambridge Course. In 1920 the University of Calcutta recognized Chrysostom as a high school, with its first graduation in 1922. At that time the school at 126 Bow Bazar Street occupied one floor of a building that had a printery on the ground floor and the top floor housed boarders; it had no playground. In the 1930s Fr. Lawrence Rodriques S.J. held Sunday raffles to purchase St. Xavier's College land at Ballygunge. In January 1937 he was able to open a large new school there, featuring tall eucalyptus trees, a flower garden, and playground. Rodrigues rechristened the school after his namesake, Lawrence of Rome.

The 1950s saw the addition of a primary school block and Jesuit residence, and a National Cadet Corps Air Wing arrived on campus. In 1976 the Higher Secondary Department was opened with majors in commerce and in science. In 1981 the boarding school, formerly on the top floor of the school, was built on the site of the former swimming pool, and the chapel moved to that building. In 1984 the school library was opened and two years later a special computer room. In 2014 Wavreil conference and meeting hall was added.

The school maintains as a goal to uplift the poor, to show equal respect for all castes, creeds, and social strata, and to promote unity in diversity. It would implement the Jesuit ideal of forming "persons for and with others."

Programmes 
St. Lawrence is an unaided, primary through higher secondary school for boys, with English as the medium of instruction. It has about 28 teachers and 22 classrooms at the secondary level, with computer-aided learning. Students are organized into four "houses" which integrate primary and high school students.

In 2017, St. Lawrence High celebrated in a big way the United Nations International Day of Sport for Development and Peace (6 April) and, along with its alumni association, sponsored an art contest for Jesuit schools worldwide on the theme of Olympic Games and Peace. In 2016 a group of students enjoyed a one-week, educational trip to China hosted by the Chinese Consul General His Excellency Mr. Ma Zhanwu.

Cricket, soccer, and basketball are the main school sports. The school has also had a championship rowing team. Extracurricular activities include speech and debate, drama, music, and choir. Dozens of videos of student activities are available on the web, as well as a tour of the facility.

Notable alumni

 

 
 Aniruddha Bose, Justice of the Supreme Court of India
 Ranadeb Bose, cricketer
 Suman Chakraborty, Professor of Mechanical engineering at IIT Kharagpur
 Kalyan Dhall , cricketer
 Utpal Dutt, actor
 Abhik Ghosh, chemist and winner of the Hans Fischer Career Award (2022) for lifetime contributions
 Nikhil Haldipur, cricketer
 Kamaleshwar Mukherjee, filmmaker
 Kharaj Mukherjee, actor
 Bedabrata Pain, scientist and filmmaker
 Saugata Roy, Member of Parliament, Union Minister, Member of Legislative Assembly West Bengal, trade unionist and educationalist
 Tathagata Roy, Governor of Tripura, engineer and Professor of Jadavpur University
 Kabir Suman, singer
 Ashok Jhunjhunwala,Padma Shree recipient

See also

 List of Jesuit schools
 List of schools in West Bengal

References

Jesuit secondary schools in India
Jesuit primary schools in India
Boys' schools in India
Christian schools in West Bengal
Primary schools in West Bengal
High schools and secondary schools in Kolkata
Educational institutions established in 1937
1937 establishments in India
Boarding schools in West Bengal